Sang-e Sefid (also Romanized as Sang-e Sefīd, Sang-i-Safīd, Sang-i-Sefīd, and Sang Sefīd; also known as Shab Dāgh, Shāh Badāgh, and Shāh Budāgh) is a village in Darreh Seydi Rural District, in the Central District of Borujerd County, Lorestan Province, Iran. At the 2006 census, its population was 415, in 101 families.

References 

Towns and villages in Borujerd County